The Franco-American flag is an ethnic flag representing Franco-Americans.

Blue and white are colors found on the flags of both the United States and francophone nations such as France or Quebec. The star symbolizes the United States and the fleur-de-lis symbolizes French culture. It can also be seen as representative of French Canadians who form a sizable population in the American Northeast.

Origins in New England 
A Franco-American conference at Manchester's Saint Anselm College in May 1983 adopted a flag to represent their New England community. It was designed by Robert L. Couturier, attorney and one-time mayor of Lewiston, Maine, to have a blue field with a white fleur-de-lis over a white five-pointed star.

Note 

This flag extends a tradition of designing flags for the French communities of each Canadian province to the United States.

References

Ethnic flags
French-American history
Flags introduced in 1992